Norman Wait Harris (August 15, 1846 – July 15, 1916) was an American banker. He founded Chicago-based N.W. Harris & Co., the predecessor of Harris Bank as well as its affiliate Harris, Forbes & Co. and later Harris, Hall & Co.

Biography
Harris was born in Berkshire County, Massachusetts in 1846, to Nathan Wait Harris and C. Emeline Wadsworth Harris.  Harris was educated at Westfield Academy, graduating at age 17 to pursue a career in business.  In 1867, at age 21, Harris joined the Union Central Life Insurance Company of Cincinnati, which he helped to found, as secretary.

In 1882, Harris founded the banking firm that would bear his name, N.W. Harris & Co.  The firm was initially based in Chicago and would later open offices in New York City and Boston.  In 1907, Harris reorganized his banking business, founding the Harris Trust and Savings Bank, based in Chicago and Harris, Forbes & Co. based in New York.

Harris was also a director of AT&T.

In 1916, during a tour of Asia, Harris suffered a heart attack in Japan.  He arrived in Seattle in May 1916, where he remained briefly before returning home.  Harris died just two months later in July 1916 at his summer home in Lake Geneva, Wisconsin.

He is interred at Rosehill Cemetery in Chicago.

Philanthropy

In his later years, Harris was a philanthropist supporting a wide range of institutions, particularly in Chicago.  Harris made substantial gifts to the University of Chicago, which in 1924 endowed an "Institute of Politics"; the Field Museum, where a $250,000 gift was used to fund a public school expansion; and the YMCA.  In 1913, Harris gave $250,000 to Northwestern University for the construction of Harris Hall of Political Science and History (today known as Harris Hall), which is located at the front gate of the University.

Harris also gave a substantial gift to the Chicago Training School for Home and Foreign Missions, the largest training school of its kind for Methodist missionaries in the United States. Harris, who was actively involved with the Methodist Episcopal Church, donated the land for the construction of its main campus and chapel.

References

External links
 Harris-Maclean Family Papers at the Newberry Library
Guide to the Norman Wait Harris Foundation Records 1923-1956 at the University of Chicago Special Collections Research Center

1846 births
1916 deaths
People from Becket, Massachusetts
Bank of Montreal
American investment bankers
19th-century American businesspeople
Burials at Rosehill Cemetery